The 1998 Peach Bowl featured the Georgia Bulldogs and Virginia Cavaliers.

After a scoreless first quarter, Virginia scored first on a 2-yard Anthony Southern touchdown run, making the score 7–0. Aaron Brooks threw a 43-yard touchdown pass to Terrence Wilkins making the score 14–0. Brooks threw a 24-yard touchdown pass to Thomas Jones as Virginia took a 21–0 lead. An 11-yard touchdown pass by Quincy Carter made the halftime score 21–7.

In the third quarter, Carter threw a 14-yard touchdown pass to Champ Bailey, as Georgia cut the deficit to 21–14. Olandis Gary's 15-yard touchdown run tied the game at 21. Brooks threw a 67-yard touchdown pass to Terrence Wilkins, but Todd Braverman missed the extra point, giving Virginia a 27–21 lead at the end of three quarters. In the fourth quarter, Olandis Gary scored on a 2-yard run, giving Georgia a 28–27 lead. Quincy Carter later scored on a 1-yard touchdown run, giving the Bulldogs a 35–27 lead. In the fourth quarter, Brooks scored on a 30-yard scoring run, bringing the score to 35–33, but failed on the two-point conversion. After Virginia recovered the ensuing onside kick, Braverman's last second field goal attempt barely sailed wide right, giving Georgia the victory.

References

Peach Bowl
Peach Bowl
Georgia Bulldogs football bowl games
Virginia Cavaliers football bowl games
December 1998 sports events in the United States
Peach
1998 in Atlanta